Top-seed Chris Evert-Lloyd won the title beating third-seed Evonne Goolagong Cawley in the final for a first-prize of $20,000. It was Evert-Lloyd's fifth title at the U.S. Clay Courts and followed an absence of three years during which World Team Tennis commitments clashed with the event.

Seeds
A champion seed is indicated in bold text while text in italics indicates the round in which that seed was eliminated.

  Chris Evert-Lloyd (champion)
  Kerry Reid (third round)
  Evonne Goolagong Cawley (final)
  Virginia Ruzici (quarterfinals)
  Regina Maršíková (semifinals)
  Kathy Jordan (second round)
  Stacy Margolin (second round)
  Caroline Stoll (third round)

Draw

Finals

Top half

Section 1

Section 2

Bottom half

Section 3

Section 4

References

External links

U.S. Clay Court Championships
1979 U.S. Clay Court Championships